The 1922–23 New York S.C. season was the second season for the club in the American Soccer League. Prior to the season the club switched from their traditional New York Football Club name to the new New York Soccer Club name. The club finished the season in 4th place.

American Soccer League

Pld = Matches played; W = Matches won; D = Matches drawn; L = Matches lost; GF = Goals for; GA = Goals against; Pts = Points

National Challenge Cup

Southern New York State Football Association Cup

Exhibitions

Notes and references
Bibliography

Footnotes

New York S.C.
American Soccer League (1921–1933) seasons
New York S.C.